Dr. Charles Lynn Pyatt (February 25, 1886—November 19, 1960) was an American Christian minister, author and academic who served as Dean of the College of Bible (now Lexington Theological Seminary) in Lexington, Kentucky.

Born in Jacksonville, Illinois, he was educated at Transylvania University, where he received his A.B. degree in 1911 and A.M. degree in 1912. Then he attended Yale Divinity School where he was awarded his Bachelor of Divinity Degree in 1913. Later he attended Harvard Divinity School and there received a Doctor of Theology degree in 1915. He was affiliated with the Christian Church (Disciples of Christ).

Pyatt died in 1960 in Fayette County, Kentucky and is buried in the Lexington Cemetery.

1886 births
1960 deaths
Transylvania University alumni
Harvard Divinity School alumni
Yale Divinity School alumni
American Disciples of Christ
Christian Church (Disciples of Christ) clergy